Cothran is a surname. Notable people with the surname include:

Charlene Cothran, American journalist
James S. Cothran (1830–1897), Members of the United States House of Representatives from South Carolina
Jeff Cothran (born 1971), American football fullback
Keith Cothran (born 1986), American professional basketball player
Pamela Cothran Marsh (born 1965),  American attorney
Shirley Cothran (born 1952),  American motivational speaker and Miss America winner
Thomas P. Cothran  (1857–1934), Speakers of the South Carolina House of Representatives
Sarah Cothran (born 2002), American singer-songwriter